The Canadian Phase I is a Canadian powered parachute that was designed and produced by Canadian Powered Parachutes of Vegreville, Alberta, introduced in 2000.

Design and development
The aircraft was designed to comply with Canadian basic ultralight rules. It features a parachute-style high wing made from rip-stop nylon, two seats in tandem accommodation, tricycle landing gear and a single  Rotax 582 engine in pusher configuration.

The aircraft is built from bolted-together aluminium tubing. Inflight steering is accomplished via foot pedals that actuate the canopy brakes, creating roll and yaw. On the ground the aircraft has lever-controlled nosewheel steering. The main landing gear incorporates shock absorber-type suspension. The standard canopy supplied was the Quantum Advantage High Performance of  area.

Factory optional equipment included a windshield, snow skis for winter operations, electric starting, a canopy-monitoring mirror and an agricultural aircraft kit.

Specifications (Phase I with Quantum Advantage High Performance wing)

References

2000s Canadian ultralight aircraft
Single-engined pusher aircraft
Powered parachutes
2000 introductions